"Chi Mat Ba Ram" (Korean: 치맛바람;  Swish of a Skirt) is a song recorded by South Korean girl group Brave Girls for their fifth extended play Summer Queen (2021). It was released on June 17, 2021, by Brave Entertainment as the album's lead single. An English version of the song was also included in the extended play.

Upon release, the song peaked at number three on South Korea's Gaon Digital Chart and number two on the Billboard K-pop Hot 100, becoming the group's third top-five hit on both charts. The music video for the track was released on June 17, and shows the group having fun in a beach-side resort. To promote the song, Brave Girls performed "Chi Mat Ba Ram" on several South Korean music programs, including Music Bank, Show! Music Core and Inkigayo.

Background and composition
In March 2021, Brave Girls rose to prominence with the sleeper hit "Rollin'", which became the group's first number one hit in South Korea. Three months later, the group announced the release of a new EP Summer Queen, their first album in four years. "Chi Mat Ba Ram" was revealed as the album's lead single. Written by Brave Brothers, the song is a tropical house and dance number with an upbeat sound. The song's title "Chi Mat Ba Ram" literally translates to "the swish of a skirt" in Korean and has been derived from the words "chima" and "baram". Although the term is often used negatively, the song is lyrically about the "fierceness in women". "Chi Mat Ba Ram" was released for digital download and streaming by Brave Entertainment on June 17, 2021, the same day as the album's release.

Commercial performance 
Upon release, the song debuted at number 14 on South Korea's Gaon Digital Chart for the chart issue dated June 19, 2021, with only two days of tracking. Additionally, it debuted on the component Download and Streaming charts at number 2 and number 28 respectively. The following week, it peaked at number three on the Digital, Download, and Streaming charts, becoming the group's third top-five hit after "Rollin'" (2017) and "We Ride" (2020).

"Chi Mat Ba Ram" peaked at number two on the Billboard K-pop Hot 100 on the issue dated July 3, 2021, becoming their third song to reach the top five and their highest-charting song since "Rollin'".

Promotion 
The music video of "Chi Mat Ba Ram" was released to YouTube on June 17 alongside the song. It was preceded by two teasers released on June 15 and 16. The video has a beach setting and shows the group enjoying themselves at a beach-side resort. The clip is interspersed with scenes in which the members are seen playing volleyball, enjoying drinks, going shopping, and performing choreography in front of the sunset. Within 10 days, the video surpassed 30 million views. To promote the song and the album, Brave Girls performed "Chi Mat Ba Ram" and the track "Pool Party" on several South Korean music programs, including KBS's Music Bank, MBC's Show! Music Core, and SBS' Inkigayo.

Accolades

Charts

Weekly charts

Monthly charts

Year-end charts

Release history

See also 
 List of The Show Chart winners (2021)
 List of Show! Music Core Chart winners (2021)
 List of Inkigayo Chart winners (2021)

References

2021 songs
2021 singles
Brave Girls songs
Korean-language songs
Songs written by Brave Brothers
Brave Entertainment singles